Ammodramus is a genus of birds in the family Passerellidae, in the group known as American sparrows. Birds of this genus are known commonly as grassland sparrows. The name Ammodramus is from the Greek for "sand runner".

These birds live in grassland habitat. Some Ammodramus are socially monogamous and both parents care for the young. Other species are polygynous with no pair bonding and no paternal care.

Several species have been included in this genus, but have been reclassified into the genera Ammospiza and Centronyx by sources such as Birdlife International and the American Ornithological Society. Current species in this genus include:

Species

The fossil Ammodramus hatcheri (Late Miocene of Kansas, United States) was formerly placed in genus Palaeospiza or Palaeostruthus. The former may not be a passeriform at all, while the latter was eventually synonymized with Ammodramus, as A. hatcheri scarcely differs from the living species.

References

 
Bird genera
American sparrows
Taxa named by William John Swainson